Nice to Be Around may refer to:

"Nice to Be Around" (song), a song from the 1973 film, Cinderella Liberty, performed by Maureen McGovern
Nice to Be Around (Rosemary Clooney album), 1977
Nice to Be Around (Maureen McGovern album), 1974